The Short Film Palme d'Or is the highest prize given to a short film at the Cannes Film Festival. Since the creation of the Cinéfondation section in 1998, a common Official Jury awards  the Short Film Palme d'Or as well as the prizes for the three best films of the Cinéfondation.

From 1952 to 1954 and from 1964 to 1974, the highest prize of the year for a short film was awarded as the Grand Prix du Festival International du Film, commonly referred to as Grand Prix.

Other short film awards

Before 1952, various prizes were awarded to short films, including a Grand Prix for Documentaries in 1947, five specific prizes in 1949, and a Grand Prix for Best Scientific Film in 1951.

During some years, short films are awarded the Prix du Jury, the Prix spécial du Jury, the Mention Spéciale, Hommage, and various prizes from the CST (Commission Supérieure Technique de l’Image et du Son), including the Grand Prix Technique.

List of Palme d'Or winners
The following list shows the short films that won the Short Film Palme d'Or, or the Grand Prix for the years that this was the highest prize awarded.

List of other awards

References

External links
 Cannes Film Festival official website
 Cannes Film Festival at IMDb

Lists of films by award

 

sk:Zlatá palma (Cannes)#Víťazi pre krátkometrážny film